Point Au Roche State Park is an  state park in Clinton County, New York. The park is in the eastern part of the Town of Beekmantown, on the shore of Lake Champlain.

Facilities
Point Au Roche State Park is a day-use park, offering a playground, picnic areas, biking paths, hiking trails, cross-country skiing, fishing, a nature center, and a sandy beach. Mooring for up to 60 boats is available in Deep Bay.

See also
 List of New York state parks
 Lake Champlain

References

External links
 New York State Parks: Point Au Roche State Park
 The Friends of Point au Roche State Park
 History of Point au Roche State Park

State parks of New York (state)
Parks in Clinton County, New York
Nature centers in New York (state)